The North, Central America and Caribbean Volleyball Confederation (NORCECA) is the international governing body for the sports of volleyball in Northern America, Central America, and the Caribbean. NORCECA is the continental confederation that represents its 35 member associations at the International Volleyball Federation (FIVB) level. It also has six associate members: Bonaire, Saba, Saint Martin, Sint Eustatius, Sint Maarten, and the Turks and Caicos Islands. The confederation is responsible for, among other things, the staging of Olympic and World Championship zone qualification tournaments, as well as continental championships for both men and women in indoor volleyball and beach volleyball. In 2022, NORCECA celebrated its fifty-fourth (54th) anniversary.

Origins and expansion
During the 1966 Caribbean and Central American Games held in San Juan, Puerto Rico, the idea of the NORCECA concept was born. At that time it was known as the Caribbean and Central American Zone. The development of the NORCECA Confederation came from the visionary mind of today’s FIVB President, Dr. Rubén Acosta Hernández, in conjunction with several other sportsmen from Puerto Rico, Cuba, Dominican Republic and Haiti. NORCECA was formally created by the FIVB and its President, Mr. Paul Liband in 1968, when Canada and the United States of America joined the confederation. Its first Senior Championship was held in Mexico from August 4–9, 1969 and the inaugural game featured Haiti vs. Panama, with Haiti winning 3-0. NORCECA’s first Junior Championship was staged in 1980.

NORCECA's presidents
Dr. Rubén Acosta Hernández (1968–1984)
Lcdo. Libertario Pérez, Esq. (1984–1988)
Lcdo. Luis R. Mendoza, Esq. (1988–2001)
Lic. Cristóbal Marte Hoffiz (2001–present)

Affiliated federations

AFECAVOL (Asociación de Federaciones CentroAmericanas de Voleibol)

CAZOVA (Caribbean Zonal Volleyball Association)

ECVA (Eastern Caribbean Zonal Volleyball Association)

NCVA (North Central Americas Volleyball Association) 

Note:

* Associate members of NORCECA.

FIVB World Rankings

Tournaments

Organised entirely by NORCECA
Men's NORCECA Volleyball Championship (men)
Women's NORCECA Volleyball Championship (women)
Men's Junior NORCECA Volleyball Championship (men)
Women's Junior NORCECA Volleyball Championship (women)
Boys' Youth NORCECA Volleyball Championship (men)
Girls' Youth NORCECA Volleyball Championship (women)
NORCECA Beach Volleyball Circuit (men and women)

Current champions

Organised alongside the CSV
Pan-American Games (men and woman)
Men's Pan-American Volleyball Cup (men)
Women's Pan-American Volleyball Cup (women)
Men's Junior Pan-American Volleyball Cup (men)
Women's Junior Pan-American Volleyball Cup (women)
Boys' Youth Pan-American Volleyball Cup (men)
Girls' Youth Pan-American Volleyball Cup (women)
Final Four Women’s Volleyball Cup (women)

Current champions

Sponsors

Volleyball organizations
Sports organizations established in 1968
Central America and the Caribbean